A sustainable community energy system is an integrated approach to supplying a local community with its energy requirements from renewable energy or high-efficiency co-generation energy sources. The approach can be seen as a development of the distributed generation concept.

Such systems are based on a combination of district heating, district cooling, plus 'electricity generation islands' that are interlinked via a private wire electricity system (largely bypassing the normal power grid to cut transmission losses and charges, as well as increasing the robustness of the system). The surplus from one generating island can therefore be used to make up the deficit at another.

Energy Communities 
Energy communities are a developing phenomenon, fostering energy transition and active participation of citizens. They are recognized as an integral part of creating a sustainable energy system by the European Union, which also included them in the Clean Energy Package and other energy regulations, such as the Renewable energy directive. 

Energy communities are any collaboration of citizens and other entities, such as municipalities, companies, energy providers, network operators, NGOs, etc., with the joint aim to contribute to energy system transformation by involving multiple actors in a participatory manner, and by aiming to create benefits for all involved parties (and potentially for society at large).

The benefits of energy communities vary and stem over different areas. Most commonly, they are associated with the environmental benefits and benefits for their members, which are often linked to financial savings. Additionally, they also benefit the larger society with the promotion of sustainable energy practices and active citizen participation. Local communities also benefit from energy communities, for example by creation of new jobs.

United Kingdom
In the United Kingdom, the first sustainable community energy system was pioneered by Woking Borough Council, starting in 1991. The system uses traditional and phosphoric acid fuel cell co-generation plants, thermal storage, heat fired absorption cooling and photovoltaics, to supply both residential and non-residential customers, as well as the Council's own facilities. By end of 2005 there were over 60 generating islands in the borough.

Despite the investment in the plant, the system delivers cheaper energy than can be supplied from the traditional brown energy suppliers, helping to tackle fuel poverty. It is part of a plan to cut local carbon dioxide emissions by 80% by 2050. Their initiatives won the Council the Queen's Award for Enterprise in 2001.

Germany
In 1997, people of Wildpoldsried, in some cases acting as individuals, began a series of projects that produce renewable energy. The first efforts were wind turbines and biomass digesters for cogeneration of heat and power.  In the time since, new work has included a number of energy conservation projects, more wind and biomass use, small hydro plants, photovoltaic panels on private houses, and district heating.  Tied to this are ecological flood control and wastewater systems.

Today, the effects of this are an unforeseen level of prosperity resulting in construction of nine new community buildings, including a school, gymnasium, and community hall, complete with solar panels.  There are three companies operating four biogas digesters with a fifth under construction.  There are seven windmills with two more on the way. One hundred and ninety private households are equipped with solar, which pays them dividends.  The district heating network has 42 connections.  There are three small hydro power plants. Wildpoldsried now produces 321 percent more energy than it needs and is generating 4.0 million Euro in annual revenue.  At the same time, there has been a 65% reduction in the town’s carbon footprint.

See also

Energy in the United Kingdom
Soft energy path
The Fourth Revolution: Energy
100% renewable energy
Energiewende

References

External links
The UK District Energy Association
Woking sustainable community energy system – case study
Energy Saving Trust – Woking case study

Distributed generation
Sustainable technologies